The Nashville White Sox were a Negro league baseball team that played as charter members of the Negro Southern League in 1920. They were located in Nashville, Tennessee, and played their home games at Sulphur Dell. Managed by Marshall Garrett, the White Sox compiled a win–loss record of 40–40 (.500), placing sixth of eight teams, in their only season of competition.

References 

1920 establishments in Tennessee
1920 disestablishments in Tennessee
Baseball teams established in 1920
Baseball teams disestablished in 1920
Defunct baseball teams in Tennessee
Negro league baseball teams
Professional baseball teams in Tennessee
Sports in Nashville, Tennessee